Kaatru Veliyidai is the soundtrack album, composed by A. R. Rahman, to the 2017 Indian Tamil romance film of the same name, written and directed by Mani Ratnam starring Karthi and Aditi Rao Hydari. The soundtrack album consists of six tracks each, in the original Tamil, and in the Telugu version of the album. Four of the tracks for the original version were penned by Vairamuthu, one by his son Madhan Karky, and one by Shellee. The lyrics to the Telugu version were written by Sirivennela Sitaramasastri. The album won Rahman the National Film Award for Best Music Direction in the “Songs” category at the 65th National Film Awards. The choreography for the songs were done by Brinda and the cinematography for the film by Ravi Varman.

Development

In late 2016, Vairamuthu, the lyricist for this soundtrack revealed that this album would have seven songs, but the original album could only retain six tracks. In the song Tango Kelaayo, it was Haricharan himself who had sung the female portion, with his vocal formant and pitch tweaked to modulate like a young sensuous female. A. R. Rahman also said in an interview to The Hindu that Tango Kelaayo was the song from the album that took the most time to be produced/composed. When Diwakar was called to sing, he was only given a small part. But later, impressed by his singing, Rahman decided to use him for the whole song; revealed Diwakar this in an interview to Behindwoods. When the song "Vaan" was being composed, Rahman had recorded it only with the keyboard for the BGM along with Tirupati’s voice, to which Ratnam agreed. Later, Rahman added the flute bit to the song after Ratnam had actually shot it in Belgrade, Serbia. Rahman also stated that a few portions of the background score were composed in London. The song "Jugni" was sung by Indian Idol 2017 contestant Tejinder Singh (the Punjabi portions alone). This, he revealed on his Twitter page. The trailer, which was unveiled by Mani Ratnam and A. R. Rahman on 9 March,  had the unreleased track "Tango Kelaayo"'s bgm and "Jugni" playing in the background. The theatrical print also had the track "Anbay" playing in the background, sung by Rahman himself, and the song "Vaan (unplugged)" sung by Shashaa Tirupati, both not included in the original motion picture soundtrack album.

Marketing
A musical glimpse of the film was released on 26 January 2017, and it was announced that the first single will be released on 2 February 2017. A short teaser of the song "Azhagiye" was released on 1 February 2017, and the full song was released the later day. The Telugu version of the song, titled "Hamsaro" was released on the same day. The lyric video reached 1 million views within 24 hours of its upload. "Azhagiye", featuring the voices of Arjun Chandy, Haricharan and Jonita Gandhi, and lyrics by Madhan Karky (his second collaboration with Ratnam after Kadal) seems to be a breezy number from A. R. Rahman. The full song (Tamil and Telugu version) has been released on Wynk Music for Android users and on iTunes for Apple users. The second single track "Vaan" was released on 14 February 2017, coinciding with the Valentine's Day. Before the single release, a promo of the song was released on 13 February 2017, on YouTube. It was released in Telugu as "Maimaruppaa" on the same day. The third single track "Sarattu Vandiyila" was launched on 1 March 2017 at midnight, also in Telugu.

Release 
The soundtrack album of the Tamil version was released on 20 March 2017 in the presence of actors Suriya and Sivakumar coming as a special guest at the Sathyam Cinemas, Chennai. The soundtrack of the Telugu version was released by Mani Ratnam and A. R. Rahman on 24 March 2017, at a promotional event held in Hyderabad.

Track listing

The tracklist was released on 18 March 2017 by Madras Talkies on their Twitter account.

Reception

The album received very positive response from critics. The film's background score received much critical acclaim upon release. The Soundtrack also marked the 25 year of collaboration of the Rahman-Ratnam combo.
Hindustan Times gave the album 4.5 out of 5 stating "The composer has taken us back to the magical ‘90s, where he used to hit the bull’s eye with every given album." Sify gave the album 4 out of 5 stating "‘Kaatru Veliyidai’ marks the 25th year for AR Rahman in the Tamil music scene. That, invariably means it has been 25 years since Mani & Rahman joined hands for the first time. The duo still has enough gas in them to surprise us and deliver an album that could make us look back and take notice. The best tracks in the album are already popular and that has indeed raised the stakes of the film. Fresh effervescence, stamp of authority, signature style, foot tapping numbers, and simple yet experimental tunes – the album ticks most boxes easily. It is very hard to not like this. And, guess what? The social media is going ballistic." Music Aloud gave the album 3.5 out of 5, stating "Kaatru Veliyidai has some good music, but, as a soundtrack, is not up to ARR-Mani Ratnam standards." 
Bollywoodlife gave the album 3.5 out of 5 stating "This is a Mani Ratnam-AR Rahman collaboration. You shouldn't miss it for the world. AR Rahman makes you fall in love again with love and music. There's a song of every kind that will give you a reason to reierate your fandom for the musical maestro." Moviecrow gave the album 3.5 out of 5 stating "Kaatru Veliyidai has the fair mix of melodies and Rahman's experimentations, However, the album is few notches below the usual Rahman- Maniratnam's soundtrack." Deccan Chronicle gave the album 3 out of 5 stating "‘Kaatru Veliyidai’ might not be Rahman's best of works, but it still reiterates his unparalleled, orchestral charm and gives you that Déjà vu, you so often have been craving. At that, it excels, and how!" Milliblog commented it as "In the 25th year of their collaboration, Mani and Rahman prove that the spark is alive and kicking." The Quint commented it as "‘Kaatru Veliyidai’ proves, yet again, that AR Rahman seldom shies away from experimenting with unexplored melodies." Behindwoods gave 3.25 out of 5 to the album and summarised "It's yet another completely avant-garde set of songs high on romance from the master combination of Mani Ratnam and Rahman!"

Awards 

 65th National Film Awards

 National Film Award for Best Music Direction - A.R.Rahman
 National Film Award for Best Female Playback Singer- Shashaa Tirupati for Vaan Varuvaan

 Filmfare Awards South

 Filmfare Award for Best Lyricist - Tamil - Vairamuthu for Vaan Varuvaan
 Filmfare Award for Best Female Playback Singer - Tamil - Shashaa Tirupati for Vaan

Album credits
Credits adapted from info published in the official CD cover.
 Backing vocals

Personnel

Production
Producer: A. R. Rahman
Mastering: Suresh Permal 
Mastering for iTunes: S. Sivakumar
Additional Programming: Ishaan Chhabra (for Azhagiye, Vaan, Tango Kelaayo, Tango Kalalo), Jim Sathya (for Tango Kelaayo and Tango Kalalo), T. R. Krishna Chetan (for Hamsaro)
Engineers (Panchathan Record Inn, Chennai): Suresh Permal, Srinidhi Venkatesh, Karthik Sekaran, Vinay Sridhar, Ishaan Chhabra, Jim Sathya
Engineers (AM Studios, Chennai): S. Sivakumar, Kannan Ganpat, Pradeep, Anantha Krishnan, Manoj, Srinath
Additional Vocal Supervision: VJ Srinivasa Murthy
Mixing: T. R. Krishna Chetan
Musicians' co-ordinators: Vijay Iyer, T. M. Faizuddin
Musicians' fixer: R. Samidurai
Chennai Strings and Sunshine Orchestra- conducted by VJ Srinivasamurthy at AM Studios, Chennai

See also
 Kaatru Veliyidai
 List of films directed by Mani Ratnam featuring A. R. Rahman

References

2017 soundtrack albums
A. R. Rahman soundtracks
Tamil film soundtracks
Sony Music India soundtracks